Miroslav Barčík  (born 26 May 1978) is a Slovak football midfielder who currently plays for DOXXbet liga club MŠK Fomat Martin. His former club was a Corgoň Liga club MŠK Žilina.

Club career
Barčík previously played for Göztepe A.Ş. in the Turkish Super Lig and Ergotelis F.C. in the Greek Super League. In August 2008 he was sent on loan from FC Spartak Trnava to another slovak club FC Nitra. He also had various offers from Poland, Hungary, Czech Republic or Cyprus.

International career
Barčík made two appearances for the Slovakia national football team, debuting in a friendly against Colombia on 20 August 2003.

Barčík also played for Slovakia at the 2000 Olympic Games in Sydney.

References

External links

1978 births
Living people
People from Čadca
Sportspeople from the Žilina Region
Slovak footballers
Slovakia international footballers
Slovakia under-21 international footballers
Slovak expatriate footballers
MŠK Žilina players
FC Spartak Trnava players
FC Nitra players
FK Iskra Borčice players
Ergotelis F.C. players
Göztepe S.K. footballers
Polonia Bytom players
Slovak Super Liga players
Ekstraklasa players
Expatriate footballers in Greece
Expatriate footballers in Poland
Olympic footballers of Slovakia
Footballers at the 2000 Summer Olympics
Association football midfielders